Troost is a Dutch surname. Troost means "comfort" in Dutch, and the name is thought have a character descriptive or perhaps occupational origin. . People with this name include:

People
 Axel Troost (born 1954), German politician
 Benoist Troost (1786–1859), Dutch-born physician, publisher and community leader in Kansas City, Missouri.
Named after him: Troost Avenue, a major north-south street in Kansas City, Missouri
 Cornelis Troost (1697–1750), Dutch painter
 Gerard Troost (1776–1850), Dutch physician, naturalist and mineralogist who emigrated to the US in 1825.
Named after him: Troost's moccasin, Troostite
 Gerdy Troost (1904–2003), German architect, wife of Paul
 J. Maarten Troost (born 1969), Dutch travel writer living in the US
 Louis Joseph Troost (1825–1911), French chemist
 Paul Troost (1878–1934), German architect, husband of Gerdy
 Renee Troost (born 1988), Dutch footballer
 Sara Troost (1732–1803), Dutch painter
 Sjaak Troost (born 1959), Dutch footballer
 Willem Troost (1684–1752), Dutch painter
 William Troost-Ekong (born 1993), Dutch footballer
Van Troost
Andre van Troost (born 1972), Dutch cricketer
Luuk van Troost (born 1969), Dutch cricketer

See also
Trost (disambiguation)

Dutch-language surnames